Torvald is a Scandinavian masculine given name and may refer to:
 Torvald Appelroth (1902–1984), Finnish fencer
 Torvald Haavardstad (1893-1965), Norwegian politician
 Torvald Högström (1926-2010), Finnish racing cyclist
 Torvald Kvinlaug (1911–1997) was a Norwegian politician
 Torvald Tu (1893–1955), Norwegian poet, playwright, novelist and writer of humoresques

Fictional characters
 Torvald Helmer, a fictional character in the play A Doll's House
 Commander Torvald, a fictional character from the Big Finish Doctor Who spin-off Gallifrey
 Torvald, a fictional character in the Nickelodeon cartoon Hey Arnold!
 Torvald Utne, a fictional character in the FX cartoon Archer
 Torvald, a Front Line champion in Paladins

See also 
Thorvald
Torvalds

Masculine given names
Norwegian masculine given names
Scandinavian masculine given names